Ansell is an Australian company which manufactures medical gloves and condoms.

Ansell may also refer to:

People
 Ansell (given name)
 Ansell (surname)

Places
Ansell, Alberta, Canada
Ansells End, England

Species
Ansell's shrew
Ansell's mole-rat
Ansell's epauletted fruit bat

See also 
 Ansel (disambiguation)